Gautama Buddha, the founder of Buddhism, is also venerated as a manifestation of God in Hinduism and the Baháʼí Faith. Some Hindu texts regard Buddha as an avatar of the god Vishnu, who came to Earth to delude beings away from the Vedic religion. Some Non-denominatonal and Quranist Muslims believe he was a prophet. He is also regarded as a prophet by the Ahmadiyyah .

Baháʼí Faith 
In the Baháʼí Faith, Buddha is classified as one of the Manifestations of God which is a title for a major prophet in the Baháʼí Faith. Similarly, the Prophet of the Baháʼí Faith, Bahá'u'lláh, is believed by Baháʼís to be the Fifth Buddha, among other prophetic stations.

Christianity 

The Greek legend of "Barlaam and Ioasaph", sometimes mistakenly attributed to the 7th century John of Damascus but actually written by the Georgian monk Euthymius in the 11th century, was ultimately derived, through a variety of intermediate versions (Arabic and Georgian) from the life story of the Buddha. The king-turned-monk Ioasaph (Georgian Iodasaph, Arabic Yūdhasaf or Būdhasaf: Arabic "b" could become "y" by duplication of a dot in handwriting) ultimately derives his name from the Sanskrit Bodhisattva, the name used in Buddhist accounts for Gautama before he became a Buddha. Barlaam and Ioasaph were placed in the Greek Orthodox calendar of saints on 26 August, and in the West they were entered as "Barlaam and Josaphat" in the Roman Martyrology on the date of 27 November.

Hinduism 

Gautama Buddha is mentioned as an Avatar of Vishnu in the Puranic texts of Hinduism. In the Bhagavata Purana he is twenty fourth of twenty five avatars, prefiguring a forthcoming final incarnation. A number of Hindu traditions portray Buddha as the most recent of ten principal avatars, known as the Dashavatara (Ten Incarnations of God).

Siddhartha Gautama's teachings deny the authority of the Vedas and consequently [at least atheistic] Buddhism is generally viewed as a nāstika school (heterodox, literally "It is not so") from the perspective of orthodox Hinduism.

Many of the eighteen orthodox Puranas mention the Buddha in a less favouring light. They present the birth of the Buddha as a ploy by the Supreme God Vishnu to corrupt asuras and sway them from Vedic teachings. Only by leading them astray with his teachings could the asuras be destroyed. This belief is sometimes associated with the asuras of Tripura (the three citadels) as well as others. Literature from the International Society for Krishna Consciousness, on the other hand, maintains that Krishna took the appearance of an atheistic teacher out of benevolence, in order to trick atheists into worshipping God (i.e., himself).

Islam 

The Islamic prophet Dhu al-Kifl has been identified with Buddha. The meaning of Dhu al-Kifl is still debated, but, according to this theory, it means “the man from Kifl“ and Kifl is the Arabic pronunciation of Kapilavastu, the city where the Buddha spent thirty years of his life. Another argument used by supporters of this theory is that Buddha was from Kapeel, which was the capital of a small state situated on the border of India and Nepal. They claim Buddha not only belonged to Kapeel, but was many a time referred to as being ‘Of Kapeel’. This is exactly what is meant by the word ‘Dhu al-Kifl’. It should be remembered that the consonant ‘p’ is not present in Arabic and the nearest one to it is ‘fa’. Hence, Kapeel transliterated into Arabic becomes Kifl.

The supporters of this theory cite the first verses of the 95th chapter of the Quran, Surah At-Tin:

It is mentioned in Buddhist sources that Buddha attained enlightenment under the fig tree. So, according to the theory, from the places mentioned in these verses: Sinai is the place where Moses received revelation; Mecca is the place where Muhammad received revelation; and the olive tree is the place where Jesus received revelation. In this case, the remaining fig tree is where Buddha received revelation.

Some also take it a bit further and state that Muhammad himself was a Buddha, as Buddha means "enlightened one".

Ahmadiyya sect 
Mirza Tahir Ahmad, the Fourth Caliph of the Ahmadiyya Community, in his book Revelation, Rationality, Knowledge & Truth, argues that Buddha was indeed a prophet of God who preached Monotheism. He quotes from the inscriptions on Ashoka's stupas which mention "Is'ana" which means God. He quotes, "'Thus spake Devanampiya Piyadasi: "Wherefore from this very hour, I have caused religious discourses to be preached, I have appointed religious observances that mankind, having listened thereto, shall be brought to follow in the right path, and give glory to God* (Is'ana)." The Ahmadiyya hold the view that the Buddha was indeed a Prophet of God.

Mirza Tahir Ahmad has also stated that the Qur'anic figure called Dhul-Kifl may have been the Buddha in his book "An Elementary Study of Islam."

In fact, a verse in the Qur'an quotes that God has sent many prophets to thee (Humanity). However, only a few have been named. It is believed by some that Buddha may (or may not) have been a Prophet of God sent to his people who taught Monotheism.

Judaism 
The story was translated into Hebrew in the 13th century by Abraham Ibn Chisdai (or Hasdai) as "ben-haMelekh v'haNazir" ("The Prince and the Nazirite").

Sikhism 
Buddha is mentioned as the 23rd avatar of Vishnu in the Chaubis Avtar, a composition in Dasam Granth traditionally and historically attributed to Guru Gobind Singh.

Taoism 

Some early Chinese Taoist-Buddhists thought the Buddha to be a reincarnation of Laozi.

See also 
 Index of Buddhism-related articles
 Secular Buddhism

References 

World religions

Buddhism and Hinduism